Rodney Norvell Stuckey (born April 21, 1986) is an American former professional basketball player. He played seven seasons for the Detroit Pistons and three seasons for the Indiana Pacers and played college basketball for Eastern Washington University.

Early life and education 
Stuckey was born in Seattle and raised in the suburb of Kent. Stuckey prepped at Kentwood High School in Covington, Washington, where he led the Conquerors to a 4A State Title in 2004.

College career 
Stuckey played college basketball at Eastern Washington University. As a sophomore, Stuckey averaged 24.6 points (7th in the nation), 5.5 assists, 4.7 rebounds, and 2.4 steals per game. Against Portland State, he scored a season high 36 points. He had nine 30-point games and three 10-assist games. He had a career high 7 steals against Idaho.

In just two seasons, he scored 1,438 points, made 98 3-point field goals, collected 279 rebounds, dished out 283 assists, and collected 145 steals.

On January 11, 2009, Stuckey's No. 3 jersey was retired at half time.

College statistics 

|-
|style="text-align:left;"|2005–06
|style="text-align:left;"|Eastern Washington
|30||30||33.0||.490||.372||.760||4.8||4.1||2.2||0.3||24.2
|-
|style="text-align:left;"|2006–07
|style="text-align:left;"|Eastern Washington
|29||29||33.3||.453||.267||.846||4.7||5.5||2.4||0.3||24.6
|}

Professional career

Detroit Pistons (2007–2014) 

On June 28, 2007, Stuckey was taken 15th overall in the 2007 NBA draft by the Detroit Pistons. Stuckey got off to a quick start with strong play in summer league and averaged 16.1 PPG, 4.8 RPG and 3 APG in pre-season play before breaking his hand in the final pre-season game. He had left-hand surgery prior to the regular season and was expected to miss 6–8 weeks before making his NBA debut. Stuckey was cleared December 20 to practice and play again, nearly two months after undergoing surgery. He made his professional debut December 21, 2007 against the Memphis Grizzlies and scored 11 points in 6 minutes off the bench.

On May 13, 2008, Stuckey was elected to the NBA NBA All-Rookie Second Team, with 22 ballot votes, including six  first-place votes.

During the 2008 NBA Playoffs, Boston Celtics forward Paul Pierce said of Stuckey's performance in game 2, "I thought Stuckey really gave us problems, I think he was the X factor in the game." That night Stuckey came off the bench to score 13 points in 17 minutes helping the Pistons win game 2 in Boston.

On December 23, 2008, Stuckey scored a career high 40 points in a win over the Chicago Bulls. He also recorded a career high field goal attempts and made field goals. He also scored 38 points in a win against the Sacramento Kings. He also played in the 2009 Rookie Challenge contest with the sophomore team during All-Star weekend.

On December 13, 2009, Stuckey was named the Eastern Conference Player of the Week for the second time in his career.

Indiana Pacers (2014–2017) 
On July 21, 2014, Stuckey signed with the Indiana Pacers. On March 10, 2015, he scored a season-high 34 points against the Orlando Magic.

On July 21, 2015, Stuckey re-signed with the Pacers to a three-year, $21 million contract. Stuckey missed most of January and February of the 2015–16 season due to a bone bruise in his right foot.

On March 28, 2017, Stuckey was ruled out for four to six weeks with a left patellar tendon strain. He was subsequently waived by the Pacers the following day.

NBA career statistics

Regular season 

|-
| align="left" | 
| align="left" | Detroit
| 57 || 2 || 19.0 || .401 || .188 || .814 || 2.3 || 2.8 || .9 || .1 || 7.6
|-
| align="left" | 
| align="left" | Detroit
| 79 || 65 || 31.9 || .439 || .295 || .803 || 3.5 || 4.9 || 1.0 || .1 || 13.4
|-
| align="left" | 
| align="left" | Detroit
| 73 || 67 || 34.2 || .405 || .228 || .833 || 3.8 || 4.8 || 1.4 || .2 || 16.6
|-
| align="left" | 
| align="left" | Detroit
| 70 || 54 || 31.2 || .439 || .289 || .866 || 3.1 || 5.2 || 1.1 || .1 || 15.5
|-
| align="left" | 
| align="left" | Detroit
| 55 || 48 || 29.9 || .429 || .317 || .834 || 2.6 || 3.8 || .8 || .2 || 14.8
|-
| align="left" | 
| align="left" | Detroit
| 76 || 24 || 28.6 || .406 || .302 || .783 || 2.8 || 3.6 || .7 || .2 || 11.5
|-
| align="left" | 
| align="left" | Detroit
| 73 || 5 || 26.7 || .436 || .273 || .836 || 2.3 || 2.1 || .7 || .1 || 13.9
|-
| align="left" | 
| align="left" | Indiana
| 71 || 36 || 26.4 || .440 || .390 || .819 || 3.5 || 3.1 || .8 || .1 || 12.6
|-
| align="left" | 
| align="left" | Indiana
| 58 || 1 || 22.0 || .413 || .241 || .829 || 2.7 || 2.4 || .7 || .1 || 8.9
|-
| align="left" | 
| align="left" | Indiana
| 39 || 0 || 17.8 || .373 || .317 || .748 || 2.2 || 2.2 || .4 || .0 || 7.2
|- class="sortbottom"
| align="center" colspan="2" | Career
| 612 || 302 || 28.1 || .425 || .298 || .827 || 3.0 || 3.7 || .9 || .2 || 12.9

Playoffs 

|-
| align="left" | 2008
| align="left" | Detroit
| 17 || 2 || 22.4 || .371 || .286 || .879 || 1.9 || 3.4 || 1.1 || .1 || 8.2
|-
| align="left" | 2009
| align="left" | Detroit
| 4 || 4 || 32.0 || .393 || .000 || .857 || 2.3 || 5.3 || .0 || .0 || 15.0
|-
| align="left" | 2016
| align="left" | Indiana
| 7 || 0 || 17.9 || .395 || .500 || .556 || 2.1 || 2.0 || .6 || .1 || 6.3
|- class="sortbottom"
| align="center" colspan="2" | Career
| 28 || 6 || 22.6 || .382 || .280 || .840 || 2.0 || 3.3 || .8 || .1 || 8.7

Personal life 
In May 2014, Stuckey became engaged to Cassandra Ferguson, a contestant on the 18th season of The Bachelor. The couple have a son named Trey.

References

External links 

Eastern Washington Eagles bio

1986 births
Living people
African-American basketball players
American men's basketball players
Detroit Pistons draft picks
Detroit Pistons players
Eastern Washington Eagles men's basketball players
Indiana Pacers players
Kentwood High School (Washington) alumni
Sportspeople from Kent, Washington
Point guards
Shooting guards
Basketball players from Seattle
21st-century African-American sportspeople
20th-century African-American people